(1531–1596) was a Japanese samurai of the Azuchi–Momoyama period, who served Matsunaga Hisahide.

He was the father of Takayama Ukon, and was a Kirishitan.

References
 Turnbull, Stephen (1998). The Samurai Sourcebook. London: Cassell & Co.

Samurai
People from Ibaraki, Osaka
Converts to Roman Catholicism
Japanese Roman Catholics
1531 births
1596 deaths